Millennium Winter Sports, known in Japan as , and in Europe as Konami Winter Games, is a video game developed and published by Konami for Game Boy Color in 2000.

Reception

The game received average reviews. In Japan, Famitsu gave it a score of 21 out of 40. Game Informer and Nintendo Power gave the game average to mixed reviews while it was still in development months before its Japan and U.S. release dates.

References

External links
 

2000 video games
Figure skating video games
Game Boy Color games
Game Boy Color-only games
Konami games
Skiing video games
Snowboarding video games
Video games developed in Japan